Knepper is a surname. Notable people with the surname include:

Émile Knepper (1892–1978), Luxembourgian gymnast who competed in the 1912 Summer Olympics
Arnie Knepper (1930–1992), American racecar driver
Bob Knepper (born 1954), former pitcher in Major League Baseball with a 15-year career from 1976 to 1990
Charlie Knepper (1871–1946), Major League Baseball player, a right-handed pitcher who batted from the right side
James Knepper (1932–2016), former Republican member of the Pennsylvania House of Representatives
Jean-Bernard Knepper (1638–1698), Luxembourg advocat and notary, and from 1693 to 1698 the Mayor of the City of Luxembourg
Jimmy Knepper (1927–2003), American jazz trombonist
Paul H. Knepper, aircraft engineer from Tamaqua, PA
Robert Knepper (born 1959), American actor

See also
Gustav Knepper Power Station, coal-fired power station in Dortmund-Mengede, close to Castrop-Rauxel